Eucalyptus aequioperta, commonly known as the Welcome Hill gum, is a mallee, sometimes a tree and is endemic to Western Australia. It has rough bark on the lower half of the trunk, lance-shaped leaves, flower buds in groups of between seven and fifteen, white flowers and more or less cup-shaped fruit.

Description
The bark is a dark grey colour, firm and flaky to fibrous over the lower half of the trunk and extending to large limbs. The bark becomes slightly tessellated on older trees and on higher branches is smooth, dull and pinkish grey to white. Adult leaves are lance-shaped, glossy and a similar green on both sides. The stamens are white.

Taxonomy
Eucalyptus aequioperta was first formally described by the botanists Ian Brooker and Stephen Hopper in 1993 in the journal Nuytsia. The type specimen was collected by Brooker near Mount Walker, north of Hyden in 1985. According to Brooker and Hopper, the specific epithet (aequioperta) means "equal cover", but Francis Sharr noted that "the precise meaning is unclear".

Eucalyptus aequioperta is part of the subgenus Symphyomyrtus section Dumaria in a sub-group of nine closely related species called series Ovulares. The rough barked members of this series include E. aequioperta, E. baudiniana, E. brachycorys, E. myriadena and E. ovularis and the smooth barked members include E. cyclostoma, E. cylindrocarpa, E. exigua and E. oraria.

Distribution and habitat
The Welcome Hill gum grows in red sand on sandhills in the Avon Wheatbelt, Coolgardie and Mallee biogeographic regions of Western Australia. It is found in an area between Corrigin in the west, Southern Cross and Coolgardie in the east but its distribution is not well known and may extend even further east.

Conservation status
This eucalypt is classified as "not threatened" by the Western Australian Government Department of Parks and Wildlife.

See also
List of Eucalyptus species

References

Eucalypts of Western Australia
Trees of Australia
aequioperta
Myrtales of Australia
Plants described in 1993
Taxa named by Ian Brooker
Taxa named by Stephen Hopper